Labu is a mukim in Seremban District, Negeri Sembilan, Malaysia.

Etymology
Labu is the Malay word for "pumpkin".

Geography
Nearby towns include Tiroi, Pelegong, Gadong, Kondok, and Jijan. Labu also known as the 'Motherland of the Datuk Syahbandar of Sungai Ujong' (Malay: Telapak Datuk Syahbandar Sungai Ujong).

History
Labu was founded around the start of the 19th century, during the reign of the eighth Datuk Undang of Sungai Ujong (Seremban), Y. A. M. Dato' Kelana Petra Sri Jaya, Dato' Kelana Leha (1780-1800).

During World War II, the Japanese used it as one of their headquarters, building up several forts near the town that were mostly demolished a double-track railway in 1995.

New Villages were built nearby during the Emergency where the local Chinese workers were kept.

President Lyndon B. Johnson visited there on a helicopter, giving his destination, Labu Jaya, the name "Felda LBJ".

Attractions

The Homestay Kampung Pelegong provides an annual feast of fruit that is open for visitors.

Kampung Tekir, an Orang Asli village, allows visitors to spend time there to study about their culture.

A new RMAF military base has been planned to be built in Sendayan but not in Labu as scheduled earlier.

Transportation
Jalan Labu Federal Route 362 is the backbone of Labu and Tiroi which serves these towns to Nilai and Seremban. Labu is also served by  the KTM Komuter Seremban Line. The Labu Komuter station has no proper tar road to this station, and its road has been broken without repairs for the past few years.

Economy

The township used to be remain underdeveloped, resulting in migration to nearby settlements due to poor opportunities, due to neglect from the town's YB man. Most locals work in the government sector, and some others work in agriculture and farming livestock. However, the Labu town now been developed under new assemblyman, YB Datuk Hasim B. Rusdi. Part of the Malaysia Vision Valley growth corridor, Labu has experienced an urbanisation boom as nearby new townships like Bandar Sri Sendayan, Bandar Ainsdale and Bandar Enstek  are currently being developed. There were two megaprojects being proposed in Labu, such as the KLIA East, a low-cost carrier terminal set to replace the original LCCT (now replaced with KLIA2 within the main airport's vicinity), and the Seremban station of the Kuala Lumpur-Singapore high-speed rail (scrapped as of now, pending possible revival).

Famous novelist Mohamed Bakarudeen Bin Abdul Kader's (Aura novelist) hometown is Labu.

See also
KLIA East @ Labu
Sekolah Menengah Agama Persekutuan Labu

References

Mukims of Negeri Sembilan
Seremban District